

Overview 

The 150th General Assembly of the U.S. state of Georgia convened its first session on January 12, 2009, at the Georgia State Capitol in Atlanta, Georgia.  The 150th Georgia General Assembly succeeded the 149th and will serve as the precedent for the 151st General Assembly in 2011.

The 150th General Assembly adjourned its first session on April 3, 2009.  The second session of the 150th General Assembly convened January 11, 2010.

Officers

Senate

Presiding officer

Majority leadership

Minority leadership

House of Representatives

Presiding officer 

Glenn Richardson (R) served as Speaker of the House from January 2009 through Jan. 1, 2010. Mark Burkhalter (R) served as Speaker pro tempore during the same period, and was acting Speaker when the House reconvened on Jan. 11, 2010, at which time the House elected David Ralston and Jan Jones.

Majority leadership

Minority leadership

Members of the state senate

Changes in membership from previous term
While no seat changed party control from the previous session, the beginning of the 150th Georgia General Assembly still saw five new state senators.  Two of these new senators defeated the incumbent in the runoff for their parties' primaries.  Two replaced incumbents who had run for other office.  Another replaced a senator who had retired.

Changes in membership during current term
There have been three vacancies in the State Senate as of December 25, 2009.  All three have been due to resignations.  Two have since been filled, both by members of the same party as the former incumbent.  Another vacancy is expected at some point during the term.

Announced retirements
As of December 25, 2009, six state senators have announced that they will not be running for re-election in 2010.  One senator, Dan Moody (56th) is retiring.  The other five are seeking higher office.

Jeff Chapman (3rd) is running for governor. Following State Insurance and Fire Commissioner John Oxendine's decision to run for governor, Seth Harp (29th) and Ralph Hudgens (47th) announced that they will seek the Republican nomination for the office.  Lee Hawkins (49th) announced that he will run for the Congressional seat to be left open by incumbent Nathan Deal's campaign for governor.  Finally, Gail Buckner is running for state secretary of state, a position she also ran for in 2006.

Members of the House of Representatives

Major issues
Severe budget cuts due to the 2009 recession.
Circumvention of the Georgia Public Service Commission, by allowing Georgia Power to charge power company customers (which includes most Georgians) for two new nuclear reactors at Plant Vogtle years before they are built.  The bill exempts businesses, putting the entire burden on residential customers.  This passed in both chambers and was signed by the governor, but has been challenged in court as having raised revenue without being originated in the lower house.
Proposed cuts in aid to counties, which reduce property taxes they must charge their residents.  These were not cut, meaning that the state, rather than the counties, will have to cut over 400 million dollars from the fiscal 2010 (July 2009 to June 2010) budget.
The massive food recall caused by the Peanut Corporation of America in Blakely, Georgia, and the role that the Georgia Department of Agriculture and lax state laws may have played in allowing it to happen.  Food-processing companies will now be required to notify the state within 24 hours of any test results indicating contamination, among other changes.
A bill to move MARTA oversight from MARTOC to GRTA, which did not pass.
A bill to permanently remove the mandatory 50/50 split on capital expenditures, so that MARTA can postpone these and maintain service (operational expenditures) during periods of low sales tax revenue.  The failure of the legislature to pass this means crippling cuts in MARTA service because it cannot access its reserve account, and the MARTA board has requested a special session to correct the situation.  The Atlanta Regional Commission has suggested giving MARTA enough money from the U.S. stimulus act to get it to the 2010 legislative session with minimal cutbacks to the already-limited public transit system.
Reinstatement of the sales tax on groceries, allegedly to target illegal immigrants.  This failed.
Elimination of sales taxes and annual ad valorem taxes on new cars, to be replaced by a car title transfer tax of 7%, including transfers between family members, and possibly to or from charities.  This would also take a significant amount of money (the 2-4% local portion of the sales tax) away from local government.  The 2000-dollar cap on the tax also would make it a regressive tax.  This did not pass.
Banning of all stem-cell research, passed by the Senate.
Gutting most of the Georgia Department of Transportation, merging all of its planning authority into a new State Transportation Authority along with the Georgia Regional Transportation Authority and the State Road and Tollway Authority.  This failed, an instead other changes were made to put more power in the hands of state politicians.
Changing state law in order to accept money for the state unemployment insurance fund from the federal American Recovery and Reinvestment Act (the U.S. "stimulus act").  This became law, but no help will get to the unemployed until May 25.
Requiring pickup truck and other truck drivers to wear their seat belts like other motorists have been for years.  This failed again as in years past.
The money will go to trauma care in the state's hospitals.

References

External links

Georgia General Assembly website
2009-2010 Representatives by Name,  District
2009-2010 Senators by Name,  District

Georgia (U.S. state) legislative sessions
2009 in American politics
2010 in American politics
2009 in Georgia (U.S. state)
2010 in Georgia (U.S. state)